The title Baron Bergavenny (or Abergavenny) was created several times in the Peerage of England and once in the Peerage of Great Britain, all but the first being baronies created by error. Abergavenny is a market town in South East Wales with a castle established by the Norman lord Hamelin de Balun .

The feudal barony of Abergavenny came into existence shortly after the Norman Conquest of 1066. The barony by writ was first created in 1392 for Sir William de Beauchamp, a younger son of the 11th Earl of Warwick. This creation passed to his son, who succeeded as 2nd Baron, and who was subsequently created Earl of Worcester. On his death, the Earldom of Worcester became extinct, but the Barony passed to his daughter, who by modern doctrine succeeded as 3rd Baroness. She died in 1447 when the Barony descended to her son, who succeeded as 4th Baron.

In 1450, Sir Edward Nevill, widower of the 3rd Baroness, was summoned to Parliament as Lord Bergavenny. It has been assumed that this summons was intended to be in the right of his wife, but as she was already dead and the Barony was already vested in her son by Nevill, by modern doctrine this served to create a new Barony by writ. This second creation merged with the first creation in 1476, when the 1st Baron (of the second creation) died and his son, the aforementioned 4th Baron of the first creation, also became 2nd Baron of the second creation.

In 1587, on the death of the 6th Baron (of the first creation) and 4th Baron (of the second creation), by modern doctrine both Baronies descended to his daughter, Mary, Lady Fane, wife of Sir Thomas Fane, who thus became de jure 7th and 5th Baroness. The title (for it was believed at the time only to be one Barony) was claimed by Edward Nevill, the heir male of the 4th and 2nd Baron, and in 1604 he was summoned to Parliament as Lord Bergavenny. As he was not entitled to either of the existing Baronies, this served to create a further Barony by Writ. By modern doctrine, the first and second creations descended to the Earls of Westmorland, heirs of the 7th and 5th Baroness, until both became abeyant on the death of the 7th Earl (and 14th and 12th Baron) in 1762.

The wrongful assumption that the Barony descended to heirs male continued, and this pattern (heirs general being deprived of their rightful title and heirs male being summoned to Parliament, with a new title being created in the process) was repeated several times, resulting in the fourth to seventh creations. The fourth and fifth creations became extinct on the death of the first holder of each, who both died without heirs, and the sixth became abeyant in 1811. The provenance of the third creation is unclear. None of these new creations were recognised as such at the time.

The last creation, and the only one in the Peerage of Great Britain, came in 1724, in favour of William Nevill. His son, who succeeded as 2nd Baron, was created Earl of Abergavenny in 1784, and the 5th Earl was created Marquess of Abergavenny in the Peerage of the United Kingdom in 1876. The Barony descended with the Earldom and then also the Marquessate (both of which were limited to heirs male) until 1938 when the 3rd Marquess died leaving no surviving sons but two surviving daughters, whereupon the Barony fell into abeyance between them. The heirs of those daughters, the 6th Marquess Camden and the 23rd Baron Hastings by the principle of moiety title are the co-heirs to one half of the Barony each and neither has petitioned for the title to be settled upon one or the other (c.f. Baron Arlington).

Feudal Barons of Abergavenny
Dates below are the dates when they possessed Abergavenny.
Hamelin de Balun (tempore William I)
Brientius de Insula (d. c. 1147)
Miles de Gloucester (died 1143) (temp Henry I)
Roger Fitzmiles, 2nd Earl of Hereford 1143–1155
Walter de Hereford 1155–1160?
Henry FitzMiles 1160?–1163?
Mahel de Hereford 1163?–1164?
William de Hereford 1164?–1165
Hugh de Beauchamp
William de Braose 1173–aft. 1179
William de Braose (tempore King John of England)
Giles de Braose 1215
Reginald de Braose 1216–1228
William V de Braose 1228–1230 ("Black William")
William III de Cantilupe,  (died 1254), jure uxoris, who married Eva de Braose (d.1255), daughter and heiress of William V de Braose.
Sir George de Cantilupe 1255–1273 (son)
John Hastings, 1st Baron Hastings (1273–1313 (nephew) 
John Hastings, 2nd Baron Hastings 1313–1325
Laurence Hastings, 1st Earl of Pembroke 1325–1348
John Hastings, 2nd Earl of Pembroke 1348–1375
John Hastings, 3rd Earl of Pembroke 1375–1389

Barons Bergavenny, first creation (1392–) (abeyant 1762)
William de Beauchamp, 1st Baron Bergavenny (died 1411)
Richard de Beauchamp, 1st Earl of Worcester, 2nd Baron Bergavenny (1397 – 1422) (created Earl of Worcester in 1421, which title extinct on his death)
 
Elizabeth de Beauchamp, later Nevill, de jure 3rd Baroness Bergavenny (1415–1447)
George Nevill, 4th Baron Bergavenny (2nd Baron of the 2nd creation) (1440–1492)
George Nevill, 5th Baron Bergavenny (3rd Baron of the 2nd creation) (died 1535); during his lifetime, Henry VIII's Laws in Wales Acts extinguished his Marcher Lordship of Abergavenny, merging it into the new county of Monmouthshire. Like other such Marcher Lords, his rights were reduced by the Act to those of an English-style Baron.
Henry Nevill, 6th Baron Bergavenny (4th Baron of the 2nd creation) (died 1587)
Mary Nevill, later Fane, 3rd Baroness le Despenser, de jure 7th and 5th Baroness Bergavenny (1554–1626)
Francis Fane, 1st Earl of Westmorland, de jure 8th and 6th Baron Bergavenny (1580–1629) (had already been created Earl of Westmorland)
Mildmay Fane, 2nd Earl of Westmorland, de jure 9th and 7th Baron Bergavenny (1602–1666)
Charles Fane, 3rd Earl of Westmorland, de jure 10th and 8th Baron Bergavenny (1635–1691)
Vere Fane, 4th Earl of Westmorland, de jure 11th and 9th Baron Bergavenny (1645–1693)
Vere Fane, 5th Earl of Westmorland, de jure 12th and 10th Baron Bergavenny (1678–1699)
Thomas Fane, 6th Earl of Westmorland, de jure 13th and 15th Baron Bergavenny (1683–1736)
John Fane, 7th Earl of Westmorland, de jure 14th and 12th Baron Bergavenny (1685–1762) (first and second creations abeyant on his death)

Barons Bergavenny, second creation (1450–) (abeyant 1762)
Edward Nevill, de facto 3rd Baron Bergavenny (1st Baron of the 2nd creation) (died 1476) (widower of the 3rd Baroness of the first creation)
George Nevill, 4th Baron Bergavenny (2nd Baron of the 2nd creation) (1440–1492) (had already succeeded as 4th Baron of the first creation)
Thereafter held with the first creation

Barons Bergavenny, third creation (1604 – ?)
Edward Nevill, de facto 8th and de jure 1st Baron Bergavenny (1551–1622)
Henry Nevill, de facto 9th and de jure 2nd Baron Bergavenny (died 1641)
Margaret Nevill, later Brooke, de jure 3rd Baroness Bergavenny
Thereafter to her heirs?

Barons Bergavenny, fourth creation (after 1641 – 1662)
John Nevill, de facto 10th and de jure 1st Baron Bergavenny (1614–1662) (extinct on his death)

Barons Bergavenny, fifth creation (after 1666 – 1695)
George Nevill, de facto 12th and de jure 1st Baron Bergavenny (1665–1695) (extinct on his death)

Barons Bergavenny, sixth creation (1695–) (abeyant 1811)
George Nevill, de facto 13th and de jure 1st Baron Bergavenny (died 1721)
George Nevill, de facto 14th and de jure 2nd Baron Bergavenny (1702–1723)
Edward Nevill, de facto 15th and de jure 3rd Baron Bergavenny (died 1724) (abeyant on his death)
Jane Nevill, later Walter, de jure 4th Baroness Bergavenny (died 1786) (abeyance terminated naturally in 1737)
John Walter, de jure 5th Baron Bergavenny (died 1806)
Charlotte Walter, later Senior, de jure 6th Baroness Bergavenny (died 1811) (abeyant on her death)

Barons Bergavenny, seventh creation (1724–) (abeyant 1938)
William Nevill, de facto 16th and de jure 1st Baron Bergavenny (died 1744)
George Nevill, 1st Earl of Abergavenny, de facto 17th and de jure 2nd Baron Bergavenny (1727–1785) (created Earl of Abergavenny in 1784)
Henry Nevill, 2nd Earl of Abergavenny, de facto 18th and de jure 3rd Baron Bergavenny (1755–1843)
John Nevill, 3rd Earl of Abergavenny, de facto 19th and de jure 4th Baron Bergavenny (1789–1845)
William Nevill, 4th Earl of Abergavenny, de facto 20th and de jure 5th Baron Bergavenny (1792–1868)
William Nevill, 1st Marquess of Abergavenny, de facto 21st and de jure 6th Baron Bergavenny (1826–1915) (created Marquess of Abergavenny in 1876)
Reginald William Bransby Nevill, 2nd Marquess of Abergavenny, de facto 22nd and de jure 7th Baron Bergavenny (1853–1927)
Henry Gilbert Ralph Nevill, 3rd Marquess of Abergavenny, de facto 23rd and de jure 8th Baron Bergavenny (1854–1938) (abeyant on his death)

Co-heirs:
David George Edward Henry Pratt, 6th Marquess Camden (born 1930) (half)
Delaval Thomas Harold Astley, 23rd Baron Hastings (born 1960) (half)

Traditional male-line succession
The succession to the notional male-line Barony of Bergavenny as it was generally assumed to be at the time was as follows:

Edward Nevill, 3rd Baron Bergavenny (died 1476) (de jure 1st Baron)
George Nevill, 4th Baron Bergavenny (1440–1492) (de jure 4th and 2nd Baron)
George Nevill, 5th Baron Bergavenny (died 1535) (de jure 5th and 3rd Baron)
Henry Nevill, 6th Baron Bergavenny (died 1587) (de jure 6th and 4th Baron)
Edward Nevill, 7th Baron Bergavenny (died 1589)
Edward Nevill, 8th Baron Bergavenny (1551–1622) (de jure 1st Baron)
Henry Nevill, 9th Baron Bergavenny (died 1641) (de jure 2nd Baron)
John Nevill, 10th Baron Bergavenny (1614–1662) (de jure 1st Baron)
George Nevill, 11th Baron Bergavenny (died 1666) (never summoned to Parliament, so not a baron by writ)
George Nevill, 12th Baron Bergavenny (1665–1695) (de jure 1st Baron)
George Nevill, 13th Baron Bergavenny (died 1721) (de jure 1st Baron)
George Nevill, 14th Baron Bergavenny (1702–1723) (de jure 2nd Baron)
Edward Nevill, 15th Baron Bergavenny (died 1724) (de jure 3rd Baron)
William Nevill, 16th Baron Bergavenny (died 1744) (de jure 1st Baron)
George Nevill, 1st Earl of Abergavenny, 17th Baron Bergavenny (1727–1785) (de jure 2nd Baron) (created Earl of Abergavenny in 1784)
Henry Nevill, 2nd Earl of Abergavenny, 18th Baron Bergavenny (1755–1843) (de jure 3rd Baron)
John Nevill, 3rd Earl of Abergavenny, 19th Baron Bergavenny (1789–1845) (de jure 4th Baron)
William Nevill, 4th Earl of Abergavenny, 20th Baron Bergavenny (1792–1868) (de jure 5th Baron)
William Nevill, 1st Marquess of Abergavenny, 21st Baron Bergavenny (1826–1915) (de jure 6th Baron)
Reginald William Bransby Nevill, 2nd Marquess of Abergavenny, 22nd Baron Bergavenny (1853–1927) (de jure 7th Baron)
Henry Gilbert Ralph Nevill, 3rd Marquess of Abergavenny, 23rd Baron Bergavenny (1854–1938) (de jure 8th Baron)
Guy Temple Montacute Larnach-Nevill, 4th Marquess of Abergavenny, 24th Baron Bergavenny (1883–1954)
John Henry Guy Nevill, 5th Marquess of Abergavenny, 25th Baron Bergavenny (1914–2000)

On the death of the 5th Marquess of Abergavenny in 2000, the pretence that the Barony of Bergavenny descended to heirs male was finally dropped, and so the 6th Marquess of Abergavenny does not claim to hold it.

Notes

References

External links
Cracroft's Peerage:
 1392 creation
 1450 creation
 1604 creation
 1641 creation
 1662 creation
 1695 creation
 1724 creation

1392 establishments in England
Abeyant peerages
Baronies in the Peerage of England
Baronies in the Peerage of Great Britain
Welsh noble families
Baronies by writ
Baron
Abeyant baronies in the Peerage of England
 
Noble titles created in 1392
Noble titles created in 1450
Noble titles created in 1604
Noble titles created in 1641
Noble titles created in 1666
Noble titles created in 1695
Noble titles created in 1762